Cican Stanković  (born 4 November 1992) is an Austrian professional footballer who plays as a goalkeeper for Greek Super League club AEK Athens. Born in Bosnia and Herzegovina, he represents the Austria national team.

Club career
Stanković was promoted to the senior squad of third tier side Horn in 2010 and joined Grödig in 2013. He moved to Austrian powerhouse Red Bull Salzburg in 2015 with great success.

AEK Athens
On 31 May 2021, AEK Athens reached an agreement with Red Bull Salzburg for the purchase of the Austrian goalkeeper. The deal includes a €1,100,000 fee for Salzburg, whereas Stanković will put pen to paper to a four-year contract, receiving €700,000 per year. The following day, AEK officially announced the signing of Stanković, who expressed his delight for joining the club and ambition to win titles.

International career
Stanković made his debut for Austria national football team on 6 September 2019 in a 2020 Euro qualifier against Latvia, as a starter.

Career statistics

Club

Honours
Red Bull Salzburg
Austrian Bundesliga: 2015–16, 2016–17, 2017–18, 2018–19, 2019–20, 2020–21
Austrian Cup: 2015–16, 2016–17, 2018–19, 2019–20, 2020–21

Individual
Austrian Bundesliga Goalkeeper of the Year: 2014–15
Austrian  Bundesliga Team of the Year: 2018–19

References

External links

 
 
 

1992 births
Living people
People from Bijeljina
Serbs of Bosnia and Herzegovina
Bosnia and Herzegovina emigrants to Austria
Expatriate footballers in Greece
Naturalised citizens of Austria
Austrian people of Serbian descent
Association football goalkeepers
Bosnia and Herzegovina footballers
Austrian footballers
Austrian expatriate footballers
Austrian expatriate sportspeople
Austrian expatriate sportspeople in Greece
Austria under-21 international footballers
Austria international footballers
SV Horn players
SV Grödig players
FC Red Bull Salzburg players
AEK Athens F.C. players
Austrian Regionalliga players
2. Liga (Austria) players
Austrian Football Bundesliga players
Super League Greece players